Zhao Jianqiang (born 22 June 1964) is a Chinese wrestler. He competed in the men's Greco-Roman 68 kg at the 1988 Summer Olympics.

References

1964 births
Living people
Chinese male sport wrestlers
Olympic wrestlers of China
Wrestlers at the 1988 Summer Olympics
Place of birth missing (living people)
Wrestlers at the 1986 Asian Games
Asian Games competitors for China